A list of file sharing programs for use on computers running Linux, BSD or other Unix-like operating systems, categorised according to the different filesharing networks or protocols they access.

BitTorrent
BitTorrent
Deluge
KTorrent
Miro
Opera
Tixati
Transmission
Tribler - Tribler uses a modified form of the BitTorrent protocol; it is anonymous and decentralized (and so does not require a tracker or indexing service to discover content).
Vuze

Direct Connect & Advanced Direct Connect
LinuxDC++

eDonkey & Kad
aMule
EDonkey 2000 (inactive)
MLDonkey

Freenet

GNUnet
Gnunet

Gnutella
Phex
gtk-gnutella
Limewire

IRC with DCC or XDCC
HexChat

Soulseek
Nicotine Plus - external

Multiple Filesharing Protocols/Networks
Apollon (inactive): Ares, FastTrack, Gnutella, OpenFT
FrostWire: BitTorrent, Gnutella
giFT (inactive): Ares, FastTrack, Gnutella, OpenFT
LimeWire: BitTorrent, Gnutella
Lphant - external: BitTorrent, eDonkey, Kad
MLdonkey: BitTorrent, DirectConnect, eDonkey, FastTrack, Kad, Overnet

File sharing software